George Nanchoff (born 1954 in Resen, Yugoslavia (SR Macedonia)) is a retired Yugoslavian-American soccer player.  He spent three seasons in the North American Soccer League and seven seasons in the Major Indoor Soccer League.  He also earned ten caps, scoring one goal, with the U.S. national team between 1979 and 1980.

Youth and college
In 1969, Nanchoff emigrated with his family from Yugoslavia, he was fifteen years old.  His family settled in Akron, Ohio, United States, where he attended Central-Hower High School.  After high school, he attended the University of Akron where he played as a forward on the men's soccer team from 1973 to 1976.  He led the team in scoring his first three seasons, but lost out to his brother Louis in 1976.  That year, both George and Louis earned first team All American.  George also had garnered first team honors in 1975.  He finished his four-year career with the Zips second on the team's career scoring list with fifty-six goals and thirty-two assists.  The University of Akron inducted George into the school's Athletic Hall of Fame in 1986.  In 1987, Summit County inducted Louis into its Sports Hall of Fame.

NASL
In 1977, the Fort Lauderdale Strikers of the North American Soccer League (NASL) selected Nanchoff in the NASL College Draft.  He scored one goal for the Strikers playing indoors. That outdoor season, he led the team in both scoring and points with eight goals and twenty-two points.  His points production dropped precipitously in 1978 as he scored no goals in ten games.  The Strikers then traded him to the Atlanta Chiefs where he rejoined his brother Louis.  He played two outdoor seasons and one indoor with the Chiefs before moving to indoor soccer full-time in the MISL.

MISL
In 1980, Nanchoff signed with the Phoenix Inferno of Major Indoor Soccer League.  In 1982, the Inferno traded Nanchoff to the Cleveland Force midway through the season.  Nanchoff remained with the force until he retired from playing professionally in 1985.

National and Olympic Teams
Nanchoff earned ten caps, scoring one goal, with the U.S. national team between 1977 and 1979.  His first cap came in a September 18, 1977, loss to Guatemala.  On October 16, 1977, he scored his lone national team goal in a 2-1 victory over China.  His last game came in a February 11, 1979, loss to the Soviet Union.

In 1979, Nanchoff was also a critical part of the U.S. Olympic soccer team which qualified for the 1980 Summer Olympics to be held in Moscow.  He led the team in scoring, but his and his teammates' hopes for success at the games were crushed when President Carter boycotted the games in protest of the Soviet Union's invasion of Afghanistan.

International goals
Scores and results list the United States' goal tally first.

Coaching
After retiring from playing professionally, Nanchoff became a youth soccer coach with the Cleveland-based Internationals Soccer Club.  In 2003, Internationals S.C. entered a men's team, the Cleveland Internationals in the U.S. Fourth Division USL Premier Development League.  Nanchoff has served as the team's coach since then as well as the club's Director of Coaching. He has also trained multiple national team prospects. Nanchoff played some games for the Internationals during the 2005 PDL season, recording 4 assists.

References

External links
 Internationals Soccer Club roster
 University of Akron article
 Summit County Hall of Fame profile
 NASL/MISL stats

Living people
Akron Zips men's soccer players
United States men's international soccer players
North American Soccer League (1968–1984) indoor players
North American Soccer League (1968–1984) players
Fort Lauderdale Strikers (1977–1983) players
Yugoslav emigrants to the United States
Atlanta Chiefs players
Major Indoor Soccer League (1978–1992) players
Phoenix Inferno players
Cleveland Force (original MISL) players
American soccer coaches
People from Resen, North Macedonia
American people of Macedonian descent
1954 births
American soccer players
All-American men's college soccer players
Player-coaches
Association football forwards
Association football midfielders